Charles Henry John Benedict Crofton Chetwynd Chetwynd-Talbot, 22nd Earl of Shrewsbury, 22nd Earl of Waterford, 7th Earl Talbot,  (born 18 December 1952), styled Viscount Ingestre until 1980, is an English nobleman and the Lord High Steward of Ireland. He is the premier earl in the Peerage of England as the Earl of Shrewsbury (created 1442), and in the Peerage of Ireland as the Earl of Waterford (1446). He also holds the titles of Earl Talbot and Baron Talbot.

In 2022, the Conduct Committee recommended that he be suspended from the House of Lords for nine months for misconduct. The Conservative whip was removed.

Background and education
Shrewsbury is the fifth child and eldest son of John Chetwynd-Talbot, 21st Earl of Shrewsbury, and his first wife, Nadine Crofton, a daughter of Brigadier General Cyril Randell Crofton. Prince Henry, Duke of Gloucester, was his godfather. His parents divorced in 1963. He was educated at Harrow School.

He is a direct descendant of John Talbot, 1st Earl of Shrewsbury, 1st Earl of Waterford, 7th Baron Talbot KG (c. 1387–1453), an English military commander of the Hundred Years' War.

Career
Shrewsbury joined the House of Lords when he succeeded to his father's peerages in 1980, at that time enjoying the automatic right to sit in parliament. He lost the right as a result of the reforms of the House of Lords Act 1999, but is one of the 92 hereditary peers elected at that time to sit in the Lords. He has served as a whip for the Conservatives.

From 1992 to 1998, Shrewsbury was the first chancellor of the University of Wolverhampton and was awarded an honorary degree of Doctor of Laws.

In 1994 he was appointed a Deputy to the Lord Lieutenant of Staffordshire, Sir James Hawley.

He is High Steward of Sheffield Cathedral, a former president of the Staffordshire Historic Churches Trust, patron or honorary president of a number of charities or voluntary bodies, and patron of ten Church of England benefices.

An enthusiastic supporter of country sports, Shrewsbury is a former president of the Gun Trade Association and remains deputy-chairman of the Standing Conference on Country Sports. He is a liveryman of three City of London livery companies: the companies of Weavers, Gunmakers and Blacksmiths. He is a former chairman of the Firearms Consultative Committee at the Home Office, and former chairman and president of the British Shooting Sports Council. Shrewsbury has sold manorial titles.

He retired as director and deputy chairman of the Britannia Building Society and then was appointed as president of the Building Societies Association.

SpectrumX 
In April 2022, the House of Lords Commissioner for Standards began an investigation into an allegation that Shrewsbury had failed to comply with rules preventing peers from profiting financially from their membership of the Lords. He was largely exonerated in May, when the Commissioner concluded that he was guilty of a minor breach of the peers' Code of Conduct and ordered him to write a letter of apology.

In August 2022, the House of Lords commissioners for standards launched a second investigation into Shrewsbury's dealings with SpectrumX, a healthcare firm that had paid him £3,000 a month between the summer of 2020 and January 2022, after leaked documents revealed that he had boasted of "very considerable" potential to open doors for SpectrumX, through what he described as his "high-level contacts".

In September 2022, the Office of the Registrar of Consultant Lobbyists concluded that Shrewsbury had failed to register his company, Talbot Consulting Ltd, before contacting Lady Barran, a junior minister at the Department for Culture Media and Sport, and Alex Burghart, a junior education minister, regarding SpectrumX. The registrar found that Shrewsbury had contravened the Transparency of Lobbying, Non-Party Campaigning and Trade Union Administration Act 2014.

In October 2022, it was revealed that Shrewsbury had failed to register that he was being paid by SpectrumX. This contradicted his earlier claims that he had reported his financial interest when promoting a SpectrumX product in 2021. On 16 December 2022 the House of Lords Conduct Committee recommended that he be suspended from the House of Lords for nine months after being paid £57,000 over two years to lobby ministers and officials, which was described as "extremely serious" misconduct that damaged the reputation of the House of Lords.

Family
On 5 January 1973, Shrewsbury married Deborah Jane Hutchinson, a daughter of Noel Staughton Hutchinson and Jenifer Hutchinson of Ellerton, Shropshire. They have three children:

Victoria Chetwynd-Talbot (born 7 September 1975). Married Daniel Goodall in 2005 and has one child, 
Charlie Goodall (born 15 September 2006)
James Chetwynd-Talbot, Viscount Ingestre (born 11 January 1978). Married Polly Blackie of Debden, Essex, in 2006, and has four children:
Matilda Chetwynd-Talbot (born 3 November 2008)
Rose Chetwynd-Talbot (born 20 February 2010)
Flora Chetwynd-Talbot (born 30 September 2011)
George Chetwynd-Talbot (born 3 May 2013)
Edward Chetwynd-Talbot (born 18 September 1981). Married Rosie Myers of Scamblesby, Lincolnshire, in 2010; has one daughter:
 Jemima Grey Chetwynd-Talbot

Shrewsbury and his family live near Ashbourne in Derbyshire – a house a few yards into Staffordshire. Lady Shrewsbury was High Sheriff of Staffordshire in 2001–2002.

Arms

References

Burke's Peerage

External links

Some Maternal Ancestry

1952 births
Living people
People educated at Harrow School
Deputy Lieutenants of Staffordshire
Conservative Party (UK) hereditary peers
Charles Talbot
Recipients of the Order of Saint Lazarus (statuted 1910)
Earls of Shrewsbury
Earls of Waterford
Barons Talbot
Earls Talbot
Hereditary peers elected under the House of Lords Act 1999